Odynorgasmia, or painful ejaculation, is a physical syndrome described by pain or burning sensation of the urethra or perineum during or following ejaculation. Causes include infections associated with urethritis, prostatitis, epididymitis, as well as use of anti-depressants.

References

Orgasm